The Ven.   Henry Lynch Blosse   was an nineteenth century Anglican priest.

The son of the 8th Baronet, he was educated at  Trinity College, Dublin. After a curacy in Cardiff he was the Rector of Michaelston Le Pit, near Cardiff in 1838 then incumbent at Newcastle, Bridgend from 1839 to 1877. He became Archdeacon of Llandaff in 1859. He held this post until 1877; after which he was Dean of Llandaff until his death on 28 January 1879.

References

1812 births
1879 deaths
Alumni of Trinity College Dublin
Archdeacons of Llandaff